Lindsay Elizabeth Agnew (born March 31, 1995) is a Canadian retired soccer player who played as a forward for the Canada women's national soccer team and National Women's Soccer League clubs North Carolina Courage, Houston Dash, and Washington Spirit.

Early life
Born in Kingston, Ontario, Agnew began playing soccer at age four. Her family moved to Syracuse, New York in 2001, and moved again to Columbus, Ohio in 2006. She attended Dublin Jerome High School in Dublin, Ohio where she played on the varsity soccer team all four years of her high school career. She also played basketball. After helping the team reach the state finals during her junior year, Agnew was named to first team All-Ohio and ESPNHS second team All-American.

Agnew played club soccer for Ohio Premier for five years and helped the team win the U-18 ECNL national championship in 2013.

College
Agnew played college soccer at Ohio State University from 2013 to 2016.

Club career

Washington Spirit
Agnew was selected by the Washington Spirit as the 19th overall pick in the 2017 NWSL College Draft. She would make 8 appearances in her first professional season.

Houston Dash
In January 2018, Agnew was traded to the Houston Dash in exchange for the third overall pick of the 2018 NWSL College Draft. She was waived by the Dash on January 22, 2020.

Sydney FC
Agnew signed with Sydney FC of the Australian W-League in the middle of the 2019-20 W-League season on January 28, 2020. She started in 5 matches, playing 450 minutes, and recorded 1 assist.

North Carolina Courage
Agnew was named as a non-roster invitee on the preseason roster of the North Carolina Courage of the NWSL on March 9, 2020. On June 19, 2020, Agnew signed a one-year contract, with a one-year option to extend, with the Courage. Upon conclusion of the 2020 NWSL Challenge Cup, Agnew would be loaned to Damallsvenskan club KIF Örebro DFF for the remainder of the season.

Retirement
On March 11, 2022, Agnew announced her retirement from professional soccer.

International career
Agnew received her first call-up to the Canada senior national team in January 2017.  
On May 25, 2019, she was named to the roster for the 2019 FIFA Women's World Cup.

Career statistics

Club

International

Personal life
Her father, Gary Agnew, is an ice hockey coach.

References

External links

 
 Ohio State profile
 
 

1995 births
Living people
Canadian women's soccer players
Soccer people from Ontario
Sportspeople from Kingston, Ontario
Women's association football forwards
Ohio State Buckeyes women's soccer players
Washington Spirit draft picks
Washington Spirit players
Houston Dash players
Sydney FC (A-League Women) players
North Carolina Courage players
KIF Örebro DFF players
National Women's Soccer League players
A-League Women players
Damallsvenskan players
Canada women's international soccer players
2019 FIFA Women's World Cup players
Canadian expatriate women's soccer players
Expatriate women's soccer players in the United States
Canadian expatriate sportspeople in the United States
Expatriate women's soccer players in Australia
Canadian expatriate sportspeople in Australia
Expatriate women's footballers in Sweden
Canadian expatriate sportspeople in Sweden